Leszek "Napoleon" Jezierski (12 May 1929 in Lublin; 
12 January 2008 in Łódź) was a Polish football striker and coach.

Biography
Born in Lublin, Jezierski played for top club Legia Warsaw. He made his debut on the national team against Bulgaria in 1954, playing for his country six times. He later became a coach, helping promote Lodz Widzew in 1975 to the First Division. After retiring, Jezierski worked as a sport commentator for print and broadcasting media. On 12 January 2008 he died aged 78 of a heart attack.

References

1929 births
2008 deaths
Sportspeople from Lublin
Legia Warsaw players
Poland international footballers
Polish footballers
Polish football managers
Lech Poznań managers
Ruch Chorzów managers
Pogoń Szczecin managers
Widzew Łódź managers
ŁKS Łódź managers
Zawisza Bydgoszcz managers
Association football forwards